Pestrin is an Italian surname. Notable people with the surname include:

Manolo Pestrin (born 1978), Italian footballer
Marika Pestrin (born 1987), Italian artistic gymnast
Paolo Pestrin (1936–2009), Italian footballer
Silvio Pestrin Farina (born 1975), Argentine businessman

Italian-language surnames